The Selwyn churches were a group of 19th century Anglican churches and chapels in the Auckland region, New Zealand named after Bishop Selwyn who inspired their construction. The majority were built in wood in the neo-gothic style and many were designed by the architect Frederick Thatcher.

Selwyn churches in the Auckland region:

 St Stephen's, Judges Bay (1844) – first St Stephen's chapel
 St Andrew's, Epsom (1846–67)
 St Thomas's, Tamaki (1847)
 St John's Chapel, Meadowbank
 All Saints, Howick (1847)
 St Mark's, Remuera (1847–60)
 St Peter's, Onehunga (1848)
 St Barnabas, Mt Eden (1848)
 St Barnabas, Parnell (1848)
 St Matthias', Panmure (1852)
 Old St Mary's, Parnell (1855–58) – replaced by St Mary's Cathedral
 St Stephen's Chapel, Judges Bay (1857)
 St James', Mangere (1857) – the only stone church
 St John the Baptist, Northcote (1860)
 St Bride's, Mauku (1860–61)
 All Souls', Clevedon (1861)
 Christ Church, Papakura (1862)
 St John's, Drury (1862)
 Holy Trinity, Otahuhu (1863) – moved in 1928 to become Selwyn Church, Mangere East
 St Sepulchre's, Eden Valley (1865–91)
 St Peter's in the Forest, Bombay (1867)

References 

Churches in Auckland
Frederick Thatcher buildings